Pudiyangadi is a town near Tirur in Kerala, India. This town was the part of the Kingdom of Tanur (Vettattnad) in medieval times.

Transportation
Pudiyangadi village connects to other parts of India through Tirur, Kuttippuram town.  National highway No.66 passes through Tirur and the northern stretch connects to Goa and Mumbai.  The southern stretch connects to Cochin and Trivandrum.   Highway No.966 goes to Palakkad and Coimbatore.   The nearest airport is at Kozhikode.  The nearest major railway station is at Tirur.

Events
The town mosque holds an annual event, the Pudiyangadi Nercha.

References

   Cities and towns in Malappuram district
Populated coastal places in India
Tirur area